Lau Shui Heung Reservoir, built in 1968 as part of the Plover Cove Reservoir engineering programme, is a reservoir located within the boundary of Pat Sin Leng Country Park in the eastern part of North District, New Territories, Hong Kong, located at the northeast area of Bird's Hill, at the northeast end of Sheung Shui-Fanling Plain. It is responsible for collecting water from the northwestern part of Pat Sin Leng and supplying it to the Plover Cove Reservoir through a water conveyance tunnel, while Lau Shui Heung Reservoir is an irrigation reservoir used to irrigate nearby farmland. The Lau Shui Heung Country Trail passes through the reservoir. The main concrete dam is 24 m high and 54.9 m long, the secondary dam is 7.3 m high and 39 m long and the scale of the reservoir is small. The reservoir is the main source of Kwan Tei River, and the water from the reservoir flows into Kwan Tei and then the Ng Tung River.

History
The reservoir was formed at the head of a valley with a construction of a 12m concrete gravity dam and a 10m earth filled dam to connect with a tunnel to provide water transfer to Hok Tau Reservoir. Construction started in 1966 and was completed in 1968.

In April 2018, mountain hikers discovered that the Lau Shui Heung Reservoir had been severely dried up recently, and cracks were seen at the bottom of the reservoir. They can walk down the reservoir to the opposite bank. The Water Supplies Department stated that the lack of rainfall in the past winter caused the water storage in the reservoir to be depleted due to irrigation by nearby villagers. However, the nearby Hok Tau Reservoir, which is also an irrigation pond and of the same size, did not dry up. It was suspected that the nearby Lung Shan Tunnel Project had drained the groundwater. Until the beginning of June that year, due to the influence of the outer rainbands associated with Tropical Storm Ewiniar, nearly 100 mm of rainfall had fallen in the past 3 days, which was more than 10 mm more than the total rainfall of the past two months. At the same time, more than 200 mm of rainfall was recorded in the past 24 hours in the northern New Territories, enough to fill the reservoir with a capacity of 170,000 m3 and restore the title of "mirror of the sky".

Environment and ecology
The entire reservoir is surrounded by tree-lined valleys and surrounded by mature woodlands, with rows of Melaleuca trees growing by the reservoir having full of greenery, very poetic and picturesque.

The reservoir is quite deep, so the color of the reservoir is green, known as mirror of the sky in Hong Kong; the bottom of the reservoir is covered with sand and rocks of various sizes, providing a diverse habitat for different fishes. Many fish species can be found in the reservoirs, including Channa asiatica, which is uncommon in Hong Kong. Because of its location in a deep valley, it became a popular place for people to go out and barbecue there.

See also
 List of reservoirs of Hong Kong
 Lau Shui Heung

References

External links

Reservoirs of Hong Kong (2) New Territories East (in Chinese)

Reservoirs in Hong Kong
North District, Hong Kong